MTV Wolfenbüttel was a basketball club based in Wolfenbüttel, Germany. The basketball club established in 1956 within the multi-sports club MTV Wolfenbüttel (Männerturnverein Wolfenbüttel / in English: Men's gymnastics club Wolfenbüttel). In 2002, the clubs license was passed to Wolfenbüttel Dukes, and, in July 2008 to today's club as Herzöge Wolfenbüttel. In 2012 Herzöge Wolfenbüttel merged with MTV Wolfenbüttel again.

In 2015, MTV Herzöge Wolfenbüttel entered into a cooperation with SG Braunschweig. Starting with the 2015–16 ProB season, both clubs will field a joined team which will play in Wolfenbüttel and serve as a farm team to Basketball Bundesliga club Basketball Löwen Braunschweig.

Honours 

German Cup
 Winners (2): 1971–72, 1981–82

Notable coaches 
  Mihai Albu

References

External links 
 Offizielle Vereinsseite (www.herzoege-wolfenbuettel.de)
 Homepage 2. BBL (www.diejungeliga.de)

Basketball teams established in 1956
Basketball teams in Germany
1956 establishments in Germany
Wolfenbüttel
Basketball Löwen Braunschweig